Fabrizio Alastra (born 1 October 1997) is an Italian footballer who plays as a goalkeeper for  club Potenza.

Club career 
Alastra is a youth product from Palermo. He made his Serie A debut on 14 February 2016 against Torino, replacing Stefano Sorrentino after 38 minutes of a 1–3 away defeat.

On 30 January 2020, he joined Pescara on loan until the end of the season.

After appearing on the bench for Parma in the first two games of the 2020–21 Serie A season, on 5 October 2020 he returned to Pescara on another loan.

On 10 July 2021, he signed with Foggia.

On 25 August 2022, Alastra joined Potenza on a one-year contract.

International career
On 25 April 2018, Alastra played a friendly match with Italy U20 against Croatia U20.

References

1997 births
Living people
People from Erice
Footballers from Sicily
Italian footballers
Association football goalkeepers
Serie A players
Serie C players
Palermo F.C. players
Matera Calcio players
Benevento Calcio players
A.C. Prato players
Parma Calcio 1913 players
Delfino Pescara 1936 players
Calcio Foggia 1920 players
Potenza Calcio players
Italy youth international footballers
Sportspeople from the Province of Trapani
21st-century Italian people